Fresh air may refer to:

Arts, entertainment, and media
 Fresh Air (film), a 1999 Australian film
 Fresh Air (Homeshake album), 2017
 Fresh Air (Faust album), 2017
 "Fresh Air" (song), by Quicksilver Messenger Service, 1970
 Fresh Air, an American radio talk show broadcast on National Public Radio
 FreshAir.org.uk, a student-run radio station serving Edinburgh, Scotland

Enterprises and organizations
 Fresh Air (airline), a defunct Nigerian cargo airline
 The Fresh Air Fund, a charity that provides summer vacations to New York City children from low-income communities

See also
 Fresh Aire, an album by Mannheim Steamroller